Željko Vuković (Cyrillic: Жeљкo Вуковић, born 29 March 1963 in Nikšić) is a Montenegrin former football midfielder.

Club career
After playing for almost a decade with his hometown club FK Sutjeska Nikšić, he moved in 1988 to another Yugoslav First League club, FK Spartak Subotica where he played one season. Since 1989 he played mostly with Portuguese Liga club G.D. Chaves, with a short spell in Austrian lower league club Wolfurt, as well.

External sources

 
 Stats from Yugoslav Leagues at Zerodic.

1963 births
Living people
Footballers from Nikšić
Association football midfielders
Yugoslav footballers
Serbia and Montenegro footballers
FK Sutjeska Nikšić players
FK Spartak Subotica players
G.D. Chaves players
Yugoslav First League players
Yugoslav Second League players
Primeira Liga players
Liga Portugal 2 players
Yugoslav expatriate footballers
Expatriate footballers in Portugal
Serbia and Montenegro expatriate footballers
Expatriate footballers in Austria
Serbia and Montenegro expatriate sportspeople in Austria

Montenegrin expatriate sportspeople in Portugal